Antoni Keller (7 June 1909 – 1996) was a Polish footballer. He played in two matches for the Poland national football team from 1934 to 1935.

References

External links
 

1909 births
1996 deaths
Polish footballers
Poland international footballers
Place of birth missing
Association footballers not categorized by position